NaNaNa Summer Girl (NaNaNa サマーガール) is the eighteenth single by the Japanese Pop-rock band Porno Graffitti. It was released on August 3, 2005.　Sew the interval of the 7th live circuit, which was held from May 7, 2005 to December 18, "SWITCH" was released.

Track listing

References

2005 singles
Porno Graffitti songs
2005 songs
Sony Music singles